The Law of Jordan is influenced by Ottoman law and European laws. The Constitution of Jordan of 1952 affirmed Islam as the state religion, but it did not state that Islam is the source of legislation. Jordanian penal code has been influenced by the French Penal Code of 1810.

Historical background
Jordanian law is influenced by Ottoman law. Until 1918, the Kingdom of Jordan was part of the Ottoman Empire and its legal system consisted of Shari'a courts whose decisions were based on the four schools of Islamic law (called madhhab). These four madhabib are: Hanafi Maliki, Shafi'i, and Hanbali. While secular courts have been established under the Jordanian government in modern times, areas of personal status still fall within the jurisdiction of religious shari'a courts.

Tribes were very important in Jordan and the tribes had varied legal traditions. During the Tanzimat reforms of the Ottoman legal system, the Ottoman Mecelle was introduced to Jordan.

The 1917 Ottoman Family Code forms the basis of modern Jordanian personal status laws.

Modern era
The first Constitution of Jordan was adopted in 1948. This started the process of creating a national legal system in the Post-Ottoman period. Both the 1948 and 1952 constitutions of Jordan affirm that Islam is the state religion. The first Jordanian Law of Family Rights was enacted in 1947; it was replaced by the Law of Family Rights 1951. In 1952 the Jordanian Law of Personal Status was enacted. The first modern Shari'a courts were established in Jordan in 1951. These courts are based on the Hanafi school, but Jordanian laws about women draw on Maliki law.

Under the 1952 Constitution shari'a courts have exclusive jurisdiction over matters regarding the "personal status" of Muslims, including marriage, divorce, guardianship and inheritance. Shari'a courts also exercise jurisdiction over Muslim religious endowments (call waqfs, "purely religious affairs" and the reconciliation of blood feuds through blood money (called diyah). In cases concerning blood feuds the shari'a courts have exclusive jurisdiction if both parties involved are Muslim. In cases where one party is Muslim and the other non-Muslim, the shari'a courts will have jurisdiction only if the non-Muslim party agrees to trial before a shari'a court.

Court system

Religious courts
Shari'a courts only have jurisdiction over personal matters, including areas of family law like marriage or divorce, child custody, adoption, and inheritance matters. Islamic religious courts only have jurisdiction over Muslims. Christians have separate religious councils for most matters. Inheritance laws are a special case which are administered through the religious courts of the family's religion, but governed by Shari'a principles in all cases.

The shari'a court system has both courts of first instance and courts of appeal. The High Court of Justice has appellate jurisdiction over the lower appeal courts. Shari'a court judges are selected from among the ulama.

Criminal law
Jordanian criminal law is based on the Ottoman Law of 1858, which in turn is based upon the French Penal Code of 1810. In 1960 Jordan issued Criminal Law no. 16. This law was strongly influenced by the Lebanese Criminal Law of 1943, which borrowed provisions from the French Penal Code regarding penalties for crimes committed against women (art 562).

After amendments were passed to article 98 of the penal code in 2017, perpetrators of honor crimes can no longer receive lenient sentences. However, a loophole still exists in article 340 that allows lenient sentences for the murder of a spouse found red-handedly committing adultery.

Personal Status law
The Personal Status law is the family law applies to all disputes involving Muslims and the children of Muslim fathers. Many Jordanian Christians voluntarily accept the jurisdiction of the Personal Status law in matters regarding inheritances.

The legal age of marriage has been increased to 18, but at the chief justice's discretion this may be lowered to 15. All Jordanian Muslims are required to be married under Islamic law. Article 19 of the Personal Status law allows women to place conditions on their marriage contracts, within certain limitations. As most women are not aware of this right, it is rarely used in practice. Women's rights advocates suggest that a list of possible conditions attached to the contract would serve to inform women of their rights under Jordanian law. The Jordanian government has elected to adhere to the Maliki school in some matters, which has restricted women's marriage rights. Hanafi law, which is the dominant influence in Jordan, does not require the consent of a male guardian for a woman to marry. However, under the law applied in Jordan a woman can not marry without the permission of either a Shari'a judge or a male guardian.

The Personal Status law does not allow women to have guardianship over children, though this would be allowed under Islamic legal principles. In Jordan, only fathers may be the guardian or welaya. A "guardian" is a person appointed under law to act on behalf of a minor or other person who does not have full legal capacity. Any female dependents under 40, who have not been previously married, are subject to lose their rights to financial maintenance if they "rebel" against their guardian.

Influence in the Occupied Palestinian territories

Israeli occupation forces accepted that the West Bank would be governed under the law that was in effect before June 5, 1967 with the condition that "security enactments take precedence over all law, even if they do not explicitly repeal it." Although passed after 1967, the Jordanian Law of Personal Status (JLPS) of 1976 is applied by West Bank courts,

The Shari'a courts of the West Bank and the Jordanian-administered Shari'a court in East Jerusalem are governed under Jordanian law, especially the Law of Shar'i Procedure of 1959. Included within the Shari'a courts jurisdiction are waqf (religious endowments), family law, personal status issues, and petitions for diya (monetary damages for murder or physical injuries). The Shar'a courts have jurisdiction over these matters where the parties are Muslim, or in cases where a non-Muslim party agrees to their jurisdiction.

See also
 Jerusalem Islamic Waqf

Notes

References
 
 
 
 
 
 
 

Sharia
Law of Jordan
Palestinian law